Juan de Dios Martínez Mera (9 March 1875 – 27 October 1955) was 23rd President of Ecuador from 1932 to 1933. He was President of the Chamber of Deputies in 1921. He was Minister of Finance from 1929 to 1930, and from 1931 to 1932.

In Quito, a main avenue is named after him.

He graduated with a bachelor's degree from San Vicente de el Guayas. He studied jurisprudence.

References

External links

 Biography of President Juan de Dios Martínez Mera 
 Enciclopedia del Ecuador por Efrén Avilés Pino

1875 births
1955 deaths
Presidents of Ecuador
Presidents of the Chamber of Deputies of Ecuador
Ecuadorian Ministers of Finance